Watu Wote: All of Us, or simply Watu Wote is a 2017 Kenyan-German, live-action short film directed by Katja Benrath, as her graduation project at Hamburg Media School. The film is based on a December 2015 bus attack by Al-Shabaab in Mandera, Kenya. The film received critical acclaim, winning a Student Academy Award for Narrative, and received an Academy Award nomination for Academy Award for Best Live Action Short Film at the 90th Academy Awards. Production faced difficulties when the crew's camera was stolen before filming had begun.

Plot
Jua, a Christian living in Kenya, boards a chartered bus to visit a relative and is uncomfortable being surrounded by Muslim passengers. The bus is stopped by the violent terrorist group Al-Shabaab, whose members demand that the Muslims identify the Christian passengers.

Cast
 Barkhad Abdirahman as Abdirashid Adan
 Faysal Ahmed as Hassan Yaqub Ali (Al-Shabaab Leader)
 Mahad Ahmed as Passenger
 Abdiwali Farrah as Salah Farah
 Charles Karumi as Issa Osman 
 Alex Khayo as GSU officer
 Gerald Langiri as GSU officer
 Justin Mirichii as James Ouma
 Saada Mohammed as Astuhr
 Douglas Muigai as GSU officer
 Adelyne Wairimu as Jua

Reception

Critical reception
On review aggregator website Rotten Tomatoes, the film holds an approval rating of 100% based on 9 reviews, with an average rating of 8.2/10.

Awards and nominations
 Nominated: Academy Award for Best Live Action Short Film 
 Winner: (Gold Plaque) Student Academy Award for Best International Film School - Narrative 
nominated for Best Live Action short film at the 90th Oscar awards.

References

External links
 Wote: All of Us at Hamburg Media School
 Watu Wote: All of Us at Hamburg Film Festival 
 

2017 films
2010s German-language films
Swahili-language films
Somali-language films
2017 drama films
2017 short films
Films set in 2016
German drama short films
Kenyan drama films
Kenyan short films
2010s German films